is a private junior college in Kita, Tokyo, Japan. The precursor of the school was founded in 1939, and it was chartered as a university in 1960.

External links
  

Private universities and colleges in Japan
Educational institutions established in 1939
Universities and colleges in Tokyo
Japanese junior colleges
1939 establishments in Japan